Shelton Jackson "Spike" Lee (born March 20, 1957) is an American filmmaker and actor. Lee's work has continually explored race relations, issues within the black community, the role of media in contemporary life, urban crime and poverty, and other political issues. He has won numerous accolades for his work, including an Academy Award, a Student Academy Award, two Primetime Emmy Awards, a BAFTA Award, and two Peabody Awards. He has also been honored with an Honorary BAFTA Award in 2002, an Honorary César in 2003, the Academy Honorary Award in 2019, and a Gala Tribute from the Film Society of Lincoln Center as well as the Dorothy and Lillian Gish Prize. 

His production company, 40 Acres and a Mule Filmworks, has produced more than 35 films since 1983. He made his directorial debut with She's Gotta Have It (1986). He has since written and directed such films as School Daze (1988), Do the Right Thing (1989), Mo' Better Blues (1990), Jungle Fever (1991), Malcolm X (1992), Crooklyn (1994), Clockers (1995), 25th Hour (2002), Inside Man (2006), Chi-Raq (2015), BlacKkKlansman (2018) and Da 5 Bloods (2020). Lee also acted in eleven of his feature films. His films have featured breakthrough and acclaimed performances from actors such as Denzel Washington, Laurence Fishburne, Samuel L. Jackson, Giancarlo Esposito, Rosie Perez, Delroy Lindo and John David Washington.

Lee's films Do the Right Thing, Malcolm X, 4 Little Girls and She's Gotta Have It were each selected by the Library of Congress for preservation in the National Film Registry for being "culturally, historically, or aesthetically significant".

Early life 
Shelton Jackson Lee was born in Atlanta, Georgia, the son of Jacqueline Carroll ( Shelton), a teacher of arts and black literature, and William James Edward Lee III, a jazz musician and composer. Lee has three younger siblings, Joie, David, and Cinqué, each of whom has worked in many different positions in Lee's films. Director Malcolm D. Lee is his cousin. When he was a child, the family moved from Atlanta to Brooklyn, New York. His mother nicknamed him "Spike" during his childhood. He attended John Dewey High School in Brooklyn's Gravesend neighborhood.

Lee enrolled in Morehouse College, a historically black college in Atlanta, where he made his first student film, Last Hustle in Brooklyn. He took film courses at Clark Atlanta University and graduated with a B.A. in mass communication from Morehouse. He did graduate work at New York University's Tisch School of the Arts, where he earned a Master of Fine Arts in film and television.

Career

1980s 
In 1983, Lee premiered his first independent short film titled, Joe's Bed-Stuy Barbershop: We Cut Heads. Lee submitted the film as his master's degree thesis at the Tisch School of the Arts. Lee's classmates Ang Lee and Ernest R. Dickerson worked on the film as assistant director and cinematographer, respectively. The film was the first student film to be showcased in Lincoln Center's New Directors New Films Festival. Lee's father, Bill Lee, composed the score. The film won a Student Academy Award.

In 1985, Lee began work on his first feature film, She's Gotta Have It. The black-and-white film concerns a young woman (played by Tracy Camilla Johns) who is seeing three men, and the feelings this arrangement provokes. The film was Lee's first feature-length film, and launched Lee's career. Lee wrote, directed, produced, starred and edited the film with a budget of $175,000, he shot the film in two weeks. When the film was released in 1986, it grossed over $7 million at the U.S. box office. New York Times film critic A.O. Scott wrote that the film "ushered in (along with Jim Jarmusch's Stranger Than Paradise) the American independent film movement of the 1980s. It was also a groundbreaking film for African-American filmmakers and a welcome change in the representation of blacks in American cinema, depicting men and women of color not as pimps and whores, but as intelligent, upscale urbanites."

In 1989, Lee made perhaps his most seminal film, Do the Right Thing, which focused on a Brooklyn neighborhood's simmering racial tension on a hot summer day. The film's cast included Lee, Danny Aiello, Bill Nunn, Ossie Davis, Ruby Dee, Giancarlo Esposito, Rosie Perez, John Turturro, Martin Lawrence and Samuel L. Jackson. Ebert later added the film to his list of The Great Movies.

To many people's surprise, the film was not nominated for Best Picture or Best Director at the Academy Awards. The film only earned two Academy Award nominations for Best Original Screenplay, Spike Lee's first Oscar nomination, and for Best Supporting Actor for Danny Aiello. At the Academy ceremony Kim Basinger, who was a presenter that evening, stated that Do the Right Thing also deserved a Best Picture nomination stating, "We've got five great films here, and they are great for one reason, because they tell the truth, but there is one film missing from this list because ironically it might tell the biggest truth of all and that's Do the Right Thing". The film that did win Best Picture was Driving Miss Daisy, a film that focused on race relations between an elderly Jewish woman (Jessica Tandy) and her driver (Morgan Freeman). Lee said in an April 7, 2006, interview with New York magazine that the other film's success, which he thought was based on safe stereotypes, hurt him more than if his film had not been nominated for an award.

1990s 

After the 1990 release of Mo' Better Blues, Lee was accused of antisemitism by the Anti-Defamation League and several film critics. They criticized the characters of the club owners Josh and Moe Flatbush, described as "Shylocks". Lee denied the charge, explaining that he wrote those characters in order to depict how black artists struggled against exploitation. Lee said that Lew Wasserman, Sidney Sheinberg, or Tom Pollock, the Jewish heads of MCA and Universal Studios, were unlikely to allow antisemitic content in a film they produced. He said he could not make an antisemitic film because Jews run Hollywood, and "that's a fact".

In 1992, Spike released his biographical epic film Malcolm X based on the Autobiography of Malcolm X, starring Denzel Washington as the famed civil rights leader. The film dramatizes key events in Malcolm X's life: his criminal career, his incarceration, his conversion to Islam, his ministry as a member of the Nation of Islam and his later falling out with the organization, his marriage to Betty X, his pilgrimage to Mecca and reevaluation of his views concerning whites, and his assassination on February 21, 1965.  Defining childhood incidents, including his father's death, his mother's mental illness, and his experiences with racism are dramatized in flashbacks. The film received widespread critical acclaim including from critic Roger Ebert ranked the film No. 1 on his Top 10 list for 1992 and described the film as "one of the great screen biographies, celebrating the sweep of an American life that bottomed out in prison before its hero reinvented himself." Ebert and Martin Scorsese, who was sitting in for late At the Movies co-host Gene Siskel, both ranked Malcolm X among the ten best films of the 1990s. Denzel Washington's portrayal of Malcolm X in particular was widely praised and he was nominated for the Academy Award for Best Actor. Washington lost to Al Pacino (Scent of a Woman), a decision which Lee criticized, saying "I'm not the only one who thinks Denzel was robbed on that one."
 
His 1997 documentary 4 Little Girls, about the girls killed in the 16th Street Baptist Church bombing in Birmingham, Alabama, in 1963, was nominated for the Academy Award for Best Feature Documentary. In 2017, the film was selected for preservation in the United States National Film Registry by the Library of Congress as being "culturally, historically, or aesthetically significant".

2000s 

In 2002, Lee directed 25th Hour starring Edward Norton, and Philip Seymour Hoffman which opened to positive reviews, with several critics since having named it one of the best films of its decade. Film critic Roger Ebert added the film to his "Great Movies" list on December 16, 2009. A. O. Scott, Richard Roeper and Roger Ebert all put it on their "best films of the decade" lists. It was later named the 26th greatest film since 2000 in a BBC poll of 177 critics. The film was also a financial success earning almost $24 million against a $5 million budget.

In 2006, Lee directed Inside Man starring Denzel Washington, Jodie Foster, and Clive Owen, Chiwetel Ejiofor, Willem Dafoe and Christopher Plummer. The film was an unusual film for Lee considering it was a studio heist thriller. The film was a critical and financial success earning $186 million off a $45 million budget. Empire gave the film four stars out of five, concluding, "It's certainly a Spike Lee film, but no Spike Lee Joint. Still, he's delivered a pacy, vigorous and frequently masterful take on a well-worn genre. Thanks to some slick lens work and a cast on cracking form, Lee proves (perhaps above all to himself?) that playing it straight is not always a bad thing."

On May 2, 2007, the 50th San Francisco International Film Festival honored Spike Lee with the San Francisco Film Society's Directing Award. In 2008, he received the Wexner Prize. In 2013, he won The Dorothy and Lillian Gish Prize, one of the richest prizes in the American arts worth $300,000.

2010s 
In 2015, Lee received an Academy Honorary Award from the Academy of Motion Picture Arts and Sciences for his contributions to film. Friends and frequent collaborators Wesley Snipes, Denzel Washington, Samuel L. Jackson presented Lee with the award at the private Governors Awards ceremony.

Lee directed, wrote, and produced the MyCareer story mode in the video game NBA 2K16. Later that same year, after a perceived long dip in quality, Lee rebounded with a musical drama film, Chi-Raq. The film is a modern-day adaptation of the ancient Greek play "Lysistrata" by Aristophanes set in modern-day Chicago's Southside and explores the challenges of race, sex, and violence in America. Teyonah Parris, Angela Bassett, Jennifer Hudson, Nick Cannon, Dave Chappelle, Wesley Snipes, John Cusack, and Samuel L. Jackson starred in the film. The film was released by Amazon Studios in select cities in November. Chi-Raq received generally positive reviews from critics. On Rotten Tomatoes, the film has rating of 82% with the site's critical consensus stating, "Chi-Raq is as urgently topical and satisfyingly ambitious as it is wildly uneven – and it contains some of Spike Lee's smartest, sharpest, and all-around entertaining late-period work."

Lee's 2018 film BlacKkKlansman, a true crime drama set in the 1970s centered around the true story of a black police officer, Ron Stallworth infiltrating the Ku Klux Klan. The film premiered at the 2018 Cannes Film Festival, where it won the Grand Prix and opened the following August. The film received near universal praise when it opened in North America receiving a 96% on Rotten Tomatoes with the critics consensus reading, "BlacKkKlansman uses history to offer bitingly trenchant commentary on current events – and brings out some of Spike Lee's hardest-hitting work in decades along the way." In 2019, during the awards season leading up to the Academy Awards, Lee was invited to join a Directors Roundtable conversation run by The Hollywood Reporter. The roundtable included Ryan Coogler (Black Panther), Yorgos Lanthimos (The Favourite), Alfonso Cuarón (Roma), Marielle Heller (Can You Ever Forgive Me?),  and Bradley Cooper (A Star is Born). It was nominated for the Academy Award for Best Picture and Best Director (Lee's first ever nomination in this category). Lee won his first competitive Academy Award in the category Best Adapted Screenplay. When asked by journalists from the BBC if the Best Picture winner Green Book offended him, Lee replied, "Let me give you a British answer, it's not my cup of tea". Many journalists in the industry noted how the 2019 Oscars with BlacKkKlansman competing against eventual winner Green Book mirrored the 1989 Oscars with Lee's film Do the Right Thing missing out on a Best Picture nomination over the eventual winner Driving Miss Daisy.

2020s 
Lee's Vietnam war film Da 5 Bloods was released on Netflix. The film starred Delroy Lindo, Jonathan Majors, Clarke Peters, Isiah Whitlock Jr., Mélanie Thierry, Paul Walter Hauser and Chadwick Boseman. The film was released worldwide on June 12, 2020. The film's plot follows a group of aging Vietnam War veterans who return to the country in search of the remains of their fallen squad leader, as well as the treasure they buried while serving there. Prior to the COVID-19 pandemic, the film was originally scheduled to premiere out-of-competition at the 2020 Cannes Film Festival, then play in theaters in May or June before streaming on Netflix. The film received widespread critical acclaim with the website Rotten Tomatoes' approval rating being 92% based on 252 reviews, with the critical consensus reading: "Fierce energy and ambition course through Da 5 Bloods, coming together to fuel one of Spike Lee's most urgent and impactful films." On Metacritic, the film has a weighted average score of 82 out of 100, based on 49 critics, indicating "universal acclaim".

Lee's next project will be a movie musical about the origin story of Viagra, Pfizer's erectile dysfunction drug. Most recently, he had signed an overall deal with Netflix to direct and produce newer movies.

Academic career and teaching 
In 1991, Lee taught a course at Harvard about filmmaking. In 1993, he began to teach at New York University's Tisch School of the Arts in the Graduate Film Program. It was there that he received his master of fine arts. In 2002, he was appointed as artistic director of the school. He is now a tenured professor at NYU.

Commercials 
In mid-1990, Levi's hired Lee to direct a series of TV commercials for their 501 button-fly jeans.

Marketing executives from Nike offered Lee a job directing commercials for the company. They wanted to pair Lee's character, Mars Blackmon, who greatly admired athlete Michael Jordan, and Jordan in a marketing campaign for the Air Jordan line. Later, Lee was asked to comment on the phenomenon of violence related to inner-city youths trying to steal Air Jordans from other kids. He said that, rather than blaming manufacturers of apparel that gained popularity, "deal with the conditions that make a kid put so much importance on a pair of sneakers, a jacket and gold".

Through the marketing wing of 40 Acres and a Mule, Lee has directed commercials for Converse, Jaguar, Taco Bell, and Ben & Jerry's.

Artistic style and themes 

Lee's films are typically referred to as "Spike Lee Joints". The closing credits always end with the phrases "By Any Means Necessary", "Ya Dig", and "Sho Nuff". His 2013 film, Oldboy, used the traditional "A Spike Lee Film" credit after producers had it re-edited.

Themes 
Lee's films have examined race relations, colorism in the black community, the role of media in contemporary life, urban crime and poverty, and other political issues. His films are also noted for their unique stylistic elements, including the use of dolly shots to portray the characters "floating" through their surroundings, which he has had his cinematographers repeatedly use in his work.

Influences 
In 2018, during an interview with GQ, Lee cited some of his favorite films as Elia Kazan's On the Waterfront (1954) and A Face in the Crowd (1957), as well as Martin Scorsese's Mean Streets (1973). Lee says that he befriended Scorsese after attending a screening of After Hours at NYU.

Filmography

Awards and honors 

In 1983, Lee won the Student Academy Award for his film Joe's Bed-Stuy Barbershop: We Cut Heads. He won awards at the Black Reel Awards for Love and Basketball, the Black Movie Awards for Inside Man, and the Berlin International Film Festival for Get on the Bus. He won BAFTA Award for Best Adapted Screenplay for BlacKkKlansman.

Lee was nominated for Academy Awards for Best Original Screenplay for Do the Right Thing and Best Documentary for 4 Little Girls, but did not win either award. In November 2015, he was given the Academy Honorary Award for his contributions to filmmaking. In 2019, he received his first Best Picture and Best Director nominations.

In 2015, at the age of 58, Lee became the youngest person ever to receive an Honorary Academy Award. Lee received the award as "a champion of independent film and an inspiration to young filmmakers". Frequent collaborators Denzel Washington, Samuel L. Jackson, and Wesley Snipes presented Lee with the award at a private ceremony at the Governors Awards.

In 2019, Lee's film BlacKkKlansman went on to receive 6 Academy Award nominations. Lee himself was nominated for 3 Oscars for Lee for Best Picture, Best Director, and Best Adapted Screenplay. He went on to win the Best Adapted Screenplay, his first Academy Award.

Two of his films have competed for the Palme d'Or award at the Cannes Film Festival, and of the two, BlacKkKlansman won the Grand Prix in 2018.

Lee's films Do the Right Thing, Malcolm X, 4 Little Girls, and She's Gotta Have It were each selected by the Library of Congress for preservation in the National Film Registry for being "culturally, historically, or aesthetically significant".

On May 18, 2016, Lee delivered the Commencement address for The Johns Hopkins University Class of 2016.

Personal life 

Lee met his wife, attorney Tonya Lewis Lee, in 1992, and they were married a year later in New York. They have two children.

Spike Lee is a fan of the New York Knicks basketball team, the New York Yankees baseball team (although he grew up a New York Mets fan), the New York Rangers ice hockey team, and the English football club Arsenal. One of the documentaries in ESPN's 30 for 30 series, Winning Time: Reggie Miller vs. The New York Knicks, focuses partly on Lee's interaction with Miller at Knicks games in Madison Square Garden.

In June 2003, Lee sought an injunction against Spike TV to prevent them from using his nickname. He claimed that because of his fame, viewers would think he was associated with the channel.

When asked by the BBC whether he believed in God, Lee said: "Yes. I have faith that there is a higher being. All this cannot be an accident."

Lee continues to maintain an office in Fort Greene, Brooklyn, but he and his wife live on the Upper East Side of Manhattan.

In May 2020, Lee published a three-minute short film, NEW YORK NEW YORK, on Instagram that was later featured on the city's official website.

Lee celebrated Joe Biden's victory over Donald Trump in the 2020 presidential election with champagne amid a crowd on the streets of Brooklyn. Photos and videos went viral on Twitter.

Controversies 
In May 1999, the New York Post reported that Lee made an inflammatory comment about Charlton Heston, president of the National Rifle Association, while speaking to reporters at the Cannes Film Festival. Lee was quoted as saying the National Rifle Association should be disbanded and, of Heston, someone should "Shoot him with a .44 Bull Dog." Lee said he intended it as a joke. He was responding to coverage about whether Hollywood was responsible for school shootings. "The problem is guns", he said. Republican House Majority Leader Dick Armey condemned Lee as having "nothing to offer the debate on school violence except more violence and more hate".

In October 2005, Lee responded to a CNN anchor's question as to whether the government intentionally ignored the plight of black Americans during the 2005 Hurricane Katrina catastrophe by saying, "It's not too far-fetched. I don't put anything past the United States government. I don't find it too far-fetched that they tried to displace all the black people out of New Orleans." In later comments, Lee cited the government's past including the Tuskegee Syphilis Study.

At the 2008 Cannes Film Festival, Lee, who was then making Miracle at St. Anna, about an all-black U.S. division fighting in Italy during World War II, criticized director Clint Eastwood for not depicting black Marines in his own World War II film, Flags of Our Fathers. Citing historical accuracy, Eastwood responded that his film was specifically about the Marines who raised the flag on Mount Suribachi at Iwo Jima, pointing out that while black Marines did fight at Iwo Jima, the U.S. military was racially segregated during World War II, and none of the men who raised the flag were black. He angrily said that Lee should "shut his face". Lee responded that Eastwood was acting like an "angry old man", and argued that despite making two Iwo Jima films back to back, Letters from Iwo Jima and Flags of Our Fathers, "there was not one black soldier in both of those films". He added that he and Eastwood were "not on a plantation". Lee later claimed that the event was exaggerated by the media and that he and Eastwood had reconciled through mutual friend Steven Spielberg, culminating in his sending Eastwood a print of Miracle at St. Anna.

Lee has been criticized for his representation of women. For example, bell hooks said that he wrote black women in the same objectifying way that white male filmmakers write the characters of white women. Rosie Perez, who was in an acting role for the first time as Tina in Do the Right Thing, said later that she was very uncomfortable with doing the nude scene in the film:

In March 2012, after the killing of Trayvon Martin, Spike Lee was one of many people who used Twitter to circulate a message that claimed to give the home address of the shooter George Zimmerman. The address turned out to be incorrect, causing the real occupants, Elaine and David McClain, to leave home and stay at a hotel due to numerous death threats. Lee issued an apology and reached an agreement with the McClains, which reportedly included "compensation", with their attorney stating "The McClains' claim is fully resolved". Nevertheless, in November 2013, the McClains filed a negligence lawsuit which accused Lee of "encouraging a dangerous mob mentality among his Twitter followers, as well as the public-at-large". The lawsuit, which a court filing reportedly valued at $1.2 million, alleged that the couple suffered "injuries and damages" that continued after the initial settlement up through Zimmerman's trial in 2013. A Seminole County judge dismissed the McClains' suit, agreeing with Lee that the issue had already been settled previously.

In March 2020, a video of Lee was released on Twitter showing the director having an altercation with the security team near the elevators at Madison Square Garden. Speculation arose as to whether Lee was being removed from the building. The New York Knicks released a statement saying, "The idea that Spike Lee is a victim because we have repeatedly asked him to not use our employee entrance and instead use a dedicated VIP entrance—which is used by every other celebrity who enters The Garden—is laughable. He is welcome to come to The Garden anytime via the VIP or general entrance; just not through our employee entrance, which is what he and Jim (James L. Dolan) agreed to [Monday] night when they shook hands." Lee disputed Dolan's story, alleging that he had been using the same entrance for the past 28 years. Lee stated he wouldn't attend the rest of the games for the season.

In June 2020, Lee defended filmmaker Woody Allen during a radio interview, despite Allen's  sexual abuse allegation, stating: "I'd just like to say Woody Allen is a great, great filmmaker and this cancel thing is not just Woody. And I think when we look back on it we are going to see that short of killing somebody, I don't know you that you can just erase somebody like they never existed. Woody's a friend of mine. I know he's going through it right now." Following social media backlash, Lee issued an apology on Twitter. Lee has also defended Michael Jackson and Nate Parker, both of whom have been accused of sexual assault.

References

External links 

Ubben Lecture at DePauw University
Criterion Collection Essay on Spike Lee's Do the Right Thing
Lee's Lens Exposes Inequalities, but he's no Revolutionary by Brendan Kelly, Canwest, April 11, 2009
Interview with Politico Magazine February 7, 2019

 
1957 births
20th-century American male actors
20th-century American male writers
20th-century American screenwriters
21st-century American male actors
21st-century American male writers
21st-century American screenwriters
Academy Honorary Award recipients
African-American film directors
African-American film producers
African-American male actors
African-American screenwriters
African-American television producers
American documentary film directors
American film producers
American male film actors
American male screenwriters
American music video directors
Best Adapted Screenplay Academy Award winners
Best Adapted Screenplay BAFTA Award winners
César Honorary Award recipients
Culture of Brooklyn
Fellows of the American Academy of Arts and Sciences
Film directors from New York City
John Dewey High School alumni
Living people
Male actors from Atlanta
Male actors from New York City
Morehouse College alumni
People from Fort Greene, Brooklyn
People from the Upper East Side
Primetime Emmy Award winners
Screenwriters from Georgia (U.S. state)
Screenwriters from New York (state)
Television commercial directors
Television producers from New York City
Tisch School of the Arts alumni
Tisch School of the Arts faculty
Writers from Atlanta
Writers from Brooklyn
Writers from Manhattan